Julia Gromyko (born 1971, also known as Julia Meier-Gromyko) is a Belarusian-German water skier. As of 2004 she was the world record holder in the tricks and jump events.

Gromyko started waterskiing at age 9 and soon won several European junior titles. Since 1989 she dominated the cable skiing world championships. After marrying Marc-Andre Meier, a German slalom waterskier and world champion, she changed her last name to Meier-Gromyko. The couple lives in Germany and has two children. Gromyko is still competing at the world level through her forties, besides coaching the German team and being member of the World Cableski Council and EAME Cableski Council. In 2004, she was selected as the Cableski Athlete of the Year by the International Waterski & Wakeboard Federation.

References

1971 births
Living people
Belarusian water skiers
World Games bronze medalists
Competitors at the 1993 World Games